Marionia elongoviridis is a species of sea slug, a dendronotid nudibranch, a marine gastropod mollusc in the family Tritoniidae.

Distribution
This species was described from Culebra Island in the Verde Island Passage, Philippines, . It has been reported from Pulau Sangeang, Indonesia.

References

Tritoniidae
Gastropods described in 2007